Municipal election for Tulsipur took place on 13 May 2022, with all 97 positions up for election across 19 wards. The electorate elected a mayor, a deputy mayor, 19 ward chairs and 76 ward members. An indirect election will also be held to elect five female members and an additional three female members from the Dalit and minority community to the municipal executive.

Background 

Tulsipur was established in 1992 as a municipality. The sub-metropolitan city was formed in 2017 by incorporating neighboring village development committees into Tulsipur municipality. Electors in each ward elect a ward chair and four ward members, out of which two must be female and one of the two must belong to the Dalit community.

In the previous election, Ghanshyam Pandey from CPN (Unified Marxist–Leninist) was elected as the first mayor of the sub-metropolitan city.

Candidates

Results

Mayoral election

Ward results 

|-
! colspan="2" style="text-align:centre;" | Party
! Chairman
! Members
|-
| style="background-color:;" |
| style="text-align:left;" |CPN (Unified Marxist-Leninist)
| style="text-align:center;" | 10
| style="text-align:center;" | 55
|-
| style="background-color:;" |
| style="text-align:left;" |Nepali Congress
| style="text-align:center;" | 5
| style="text-align:center;" | 18
|-
| style="background-color:;" |
| style="text-align:left;" |CPN (Maoist Centre)
| style="text-align:center;" | 3
| style="text-align:center;" | 3
|-
| style="background-color:;" |
| style="text-align:left;" |Independent
| style="text-align:center;" | 1
| style="text-align:center;" | 0
|-
! colspan="2" style="text-align:right;" | Total
! 19
! 76
|}

Summary of Results by ward

See also 

 2022 Nepalese local elections
 2022 Lalitpur municipal election
 2022 Kathmandu municipal election
 2022 Janakpur municipal election
 2022 Pokhara municipal election

References

Tulsipur